The Victoria Falls Power Station is a hydroelectric power plant on the Zambezi River in Livingstone, Zambia. It is located in the third gorge below Victoria Falls and consists of three power stations with a total capacity of :
 Station A, commissioned in 1936, has an installed capacity of : 2 x  and 2 x  machines. 
 Station B, commissioned in 1968, has an installed capacity of : 6 x  machines. 
 Station C, also commissioned in 1968, has an installed capacity of : 4 x  machines).

The station is owned and operated by Zesco, the state owned power utility.

References

Energy infrastructure completed in 1936
Energy infrastructure completed in 1968
Hydroelectric power stations in Zambia
Victoria Falls
Livingstone, Zambia